Paschalis Stathelakos, (Greek: Πασχάλης Σταθελάκος) (born 24 February 1991) is a Paralympian athlete from Greece competing mainly in category F40 shot put events.

He competed in the 2008 Summer Paralympics in Beijing, China. There he won a gold medal in the men's F40 shot put event.

External links
 

Living people
1991 births
Paralympic athletes of Greece
Greek male discus throwers
Greek male shot putters
Athletes (track and field) at the 2008 Summer Paralympics
Athletes (track and field) at the 2012 Summer Paralympics
Paralympic gold medalists for Greece
Medalists at the 2008 Summer Paralympics
Medalists at the 2012 Summer Paralympics
Paralympic silver medalists for Greece
Paralympic bronze medalists for Greece
Paralympic medalists in athletics (track and field)
Paralympic shot putters
Paralympic discus throwers
21st-century Greek people